The Austria national rugby union team is a third tier rugby union playing nation. They began playing international rugby in the early 1990s. Thus far, Austria has not made an appearance at any of the World Cups.

The national side is ranked 87th in the world, as of 16 January 2023.

History
Austria played their first official international on 3 May 1992 against Hungary, losing 23 points to nine. Austria had another fixture against Hungary that year, it was the first home game, which they lost 5:3, as well as two games against Slovenia. Austria's first win came against Slovenia on 21 November 1992, winning 9:5. Austria played nations such as Croatia and Ukraine as well as regulars Slovenia.

From 1996 on Austria began winning more games, and only lost a few sporadic matches in the late 1990s, as they were now beating the European sides that had beaten them in the early 1990s. During the 2000s Austria were now playing a larger variety of nations. After not winning one game in 2002, Austria went on to win every fixture in 2004, creating an undefeated streak which was broken by Denmark in  2005.

2014 Squad
Squad to 2014 European Nations Cup - Division 2C.

Maximillian Müller
Milad Farkhondeh-Fal (C)
Omar El Agrebi
Max Kinsky
Mathias Hemetsberger
Johannes Dachler
Stefan Asboth
Stefan Psota
Michael Kerschbaumer
Max Navas
Martin Leidl
Fabian Weidinger
David Barry
Stefan Reiseneder
Lukas Dobner
Mushegh Aslanyan
Maximillian Freydell
Jakob Liska
Michael Oberhauser
Stefan Pauser
Patrick Panek
Jakob Leissing
Gordon Chiu
Philipp Weidman

Record

Coaches

References

External links
 Österreichischer Rugby Verband - Official Site 

Teams in European Nations Cup (rugby union)
Rugby union in Austria
European national rugby union teams
Rugby